"Denise" is a song written by Neil Levenson that was inspired by his childhood friend, Denise Lefrak. In 1963, it became a popular top ten hit on the Billboard Hot 100 chart, when recorded by the American doo-wop group Randy & the Rainbows. A cover version by the American new wave group Blondie, re-titled "Denis", hit number 2 in the UK Singles Chart in 1978. Dutch actress and singer Georgina Verbaan covered "Denis" in 2002 and reached number 30 on the Dutch Singles Chart.

Randy & the Rainbows version
The American doo-wop group Randy & the Rainbows recorded "Denise" with the producers of The Tokens, releasing it as a single in 1963. The group's name "Randy & the Rainbows" was chosen by the owners of Laurie Records after the group recorded "Denise". Previously, the band had been called "Junior & the Counts" and "The Encores". "Denise" spent seventeen weeks on the Billboard Hot 100 chart, settling at number 10, while peaking at number 18 on the Billboard Hot R&B Singles chart, and number 5 on Canada's CHUM Hit Parade.

The song was ranked number 27 on Billboards end of year ranking "Top Records of 1963" and number 60 on Cash Boxs "Top 100 Chart Hits of 1963".

Track listings
 "Denise" (Levenson) – 1:57
 "Come Back" 2:17

Chart performance

Blondie version

"Denis" (using the masculine form of the name in French, with a silent "s") is a 1978 cover of the song by the American new wave band Blondie. This effort helped the band break into the international market. It was featured on the band's second studio album, Plastic Letters (1978), and was the second UK single release by Blondie on Chrysalis Records. Cash Box said it has "recognizable thrashing guitar licks, kick drumming and Deborah [Harry's] bright vocals."  Record World said that "The effect is faithful to the original but more than slightly ironic as well."

The initial Blondie version contained a verse with partly improvised lyrics in French by the group's vocalist Debbie Harry. The second, re-recorded version had its debut as a bonus track on EMI UK's 1994 re-issue of Plastic Letters.

"Denis" was released in February 1978 and scored a number 2 in the UK and broke into the Top 20 in most European countries, including number 1 in Netherlands. In the UK, the song was kept at number 2 for three weeks, first by Kate Bush's "Wuthering Heights" and then by Brian and Michael's "Matchstalk Men and Matchstalk Cats and Dogs". Just like "Rip Her to Shreds", the single was issued on both 7" and 12" formats in the UK, and both feature two B-sides, "Contact in Red Square" from Plastic Letters and "Kung-Fu Girls" from Blondie. "Denis" was the only single released in the US from Plastic Letters (with "I'm on E" as the B-side) though it never charted. In 1988, a remixed version of the track was issued as a single from the Blondie/Debbie Harry remix compilation Once More into the Bleach. This time the single reached number 50 in the UK.

Track listings
1978 Release
UK 7" and 12" (CHS 2204)
 "Denis" (Levenson) – 2:18
 "Contact in Red Square" (Destri) – 2:01
 "Kung-Fu Girls" (Destri, Harry, Valentine) – 2:33

US 7" (CHS 2220)
 "Denis" (Levenson) – 2:18
 "I'm on E" (Harry, Stein) – 2:13

1988 Release
UK 7" (CHS 3328)
 "Denis '88" – 5:26
 "Rapture" (The Teddy Riley Remix) – 7:02

UK 12" (CHS 12 3328)
 "Denis" (The Danny D Remix) – 5:26
 "Rapture" (The Teddy Riley Remix) – 7:02
 "Rapture" (The Teddy Riley Dub Version) – ?:??

UK CD (CHS CD 3328)
 "Denis '88" – 5:26
 "Rapture (The Teddy Riley Remix) – 7:02
 "Heart Of Glass" – 4:00
 "Atomic" – 3:32

Chart performance

Weekly charts

Year-end charts

Georgina Verbaan version

In 2002, Dutch actress and singer Georgina Verbaan recorded a cover version of "Denis" for her debut studio album Sugar Spider. Her version of the song was issued on the Jive Records label as a single and it reached number 30 on the Dutch Singles Chart.

Track listings
"Denis"
"No More Lies"

Chart performance

See also
List of number-one hits (Belgium)
List of Dutch Top 40 number-one singles of 1978
List of European number-one hits of 1978

References

1963 songs
1963 singles
1978 singles
2002 singles
Blondie (band) songs
Chrysalis Records singles
Doo-wop songs
Dutch Top 40 number-one singles
European Hot 100 Singles number-one singles
Macaronic songs
Song recordings produced by Richard Gottehrer